NGC 5343 is an elliptical galaxy in the constellation of Virgo. It was discovered on 5 May 1785 by William Herschel.

References

Notes

Elliptical galaxies
Virgo (constellation)
5343
49412